John Desmond Sheridan (1903–1980) was an Irish novelist, short story writer, and humourist.  He was a frequent contributor to the Irish Independent newspaper.  In addition to his novels and essays, he also published several books of poetry, and authored a biography of poet James Clarence Mangan in 1937.

Sheridan released several short stories. Most of his stories are of a humorous nature and are often about his phobias or pet hates.

Bibliography 
Fiction
 Vanishing Spring
 Here's Their Memory
 Paradise Alley
 The Magnificent MacDarney
 God Made Little Apples
 The Rest is Silence

Humorous Essays
 I Can't Help Laughing
 I Laugh to Think
 Half in Earnest
 My Hat Blew Off
 The Right Time
 While the Humour is on Me
 Funnily Enough
 Bright Intervals
 Joking Apart
 Include Me Out
 It Stance to Reason (The Intelligent Rabbit's Guide to Golf)

Poetry
 Joe's no Saint and Other Poems
 Stirabout Lane

Other
 James Clarence Mangan - a Biography
 The Hungry Sheep: Catholic Doctrine Restated against Contemporary Attacks
 New Pence for Old: An Introduction to the New Decimal Currency
 An Outline Geography
 Ireland in Colour (with Kenneth Scowen)

References

External links
 John D. Sheridan Biography at Irish Writers Online, retrieved Sept 15 2007.

1903 births
1980 deaths
Irish writers
Irish humorists